Faten Hamama (27 May 1931 – 17 January 2015) was an Egyptian film and television actress and film producer. She was the first wife of film director Ezz El-Dine Zulficar. 

This is the complete filmography of Faten Hamama, an Egyptian actress:

Feature films

Television

Production

See also 
Top 100 Egyptian films
Lists of Egyptian films
Salah Zulfikar filmography
Soad Hosny filmography

References 

Egyptian filmographies
Hamama, Faten